Norman Harris may refer to:

Norman Harris (musician) (1947–1987), American guitarist, producer, arranger and songwriter
Norman Harris (rugby) (died 2007), Welsh rugby union and rugby league footballer
Norman Wait Harris (1846–1916), American banker
Norman Charles Harris (1887–1963), Australian army and railway engineer
Norm Harris (1906–1985), Australian rules footballer
Norman Harris (businessman) (born 1949), vintage guitar dealer